Pittsburgh held a mayoral election on November 3, 2009. Incumbent mayor Luke Ravenstahl, a Democrat, defeated his two independent challengers by a wide margin. The 2009 election was the first regular-cycle election in which Ravenstahl participated; he was originally appointed as an interim mayor to succeed Bob O'Connor and subsequently won a special election in 2007.

Primary
The primary election was held on May 19, 2009. In the Democratic primary, incumbent Mayor Ravenstahl defeated challengers Patrick Dowd, a Pittsburgh city councilman, and Carmen Robinson, an attorney and former police officer.

The Republican primary had no names on the ballot for the office of mayor. Ravenstahl, a Democrat, won the Republican mayoral nomination with 607 write-in votes; no other candidate had the 250 write-in votes required to become the Republican nominee.

General
Ravenstahl, having been nominated by both the Democratic Party and the Republican Party, appeared on the general-election ballot with both affiliations. He was joined by two other candidates: businessman Franco 'Dok' Harris (the son of Pittsburgh Steelers legend Franco Harris), who ran under the Franco Dok Harris Party, and attorney Kevin Acklin, who ran as an independent. Ravenstahl's relationship with lobbyist John Verbanac became a campaign issue.

Ravenstahl defeated both Harris and Acklin by a wide margin, winning over 55 percent of the vote.

Election results

Democratic primary

General election

|-
! style="background-color: #800080; width: 2px;" |
| style="width: 130px" | Democratic/Republican
|               | Luke Ravenstahl (incumbent)
| align="right" | 28,528
| align="right" | 55.22%
|-

References

2009
2009 Pennsylvania elections
2009 United States mayoral elections
2000s in Pittsburgh
November 2007 events in the United States